The Drama Desk Award for Outstanding Puppet Design is an annual award presented by the Drama Desk in recognition of achievements in the theatre among Broadway, off-Broadway, and off-off-Broadway productions. After the award was first given, in 1998, it was not presented again until 2017.

Unlike some Drama Desk Awards, the award for Outstanding Puppet Design combines musicals and plays into a single category.

Winners and nominees

1990s

2010s

2020s

References

Puppet Design